The 2021–22 Western Kentucky Hilltoppers men's basketball team represented Western Kentucky University during the 2021–22 NCAA Division I men's basketball season. The Hilltoppers were led by head coach Rick Stansbury in his sixth season and played their home games at E. A. Diddle Arena in Bowling Green, Kentucky as eighth-year members of Conference USA.

Previous season
The Hilltoppers finished the 2021–22 season 21–8, 11–3 in C-USA play to win the West Division. They defeated UTSA, UAB in the quarterfinals and semifinals of the C-USA tournament before losing to North Texas in the championship. They received a bid to the National Invitation Tournament, where they defeated Saint Mary's losing to C-USA member Louisiana Tech in the quarterfinals.

Offseason

Departures

Incoming transfers

2021 recruiting class

Roster

Schedule 

|-
!colspan=12 style=| Exhibition

|-
!colspan=12 style=| Non-conference Regular season

|-
!colspan=12 style=| Conference USA regular season

|-
!colspan=12 style=| Conference USA Tournament

Source

References

Western Kentucky
Western Kentucky Hilltoppers basketball seasons
Western Kentucky Basketball, Men's
Western Kentucky Basketball, Men's